West Virginia is the third poorest state in the United States of America, with a per capita income of $23,450 (2015).

West Virginia counties ranked by per capita income 

Note: County Data is from the 2011–2015 American Community Survey 5-Year Estimates.

References

United States locations by per capita income
Economy of West Virginia
Income
Income